Henry Phipps may refer to:

 Henry Carnegie Phipps (1879–1953), sportsman and financier
 Henry Phipps Jr. (1839–1930), entrepreneur and major philanthropist
 Henry Phipps, 1st Earl of Mulgrave (1755–1831), soldier and politician

See also
 Henry Phipps House, New York City